Óscar Bustos (born 26 August 1971) is a Chilean former professional tennis player.

Bustos played collegiate tennis for Arizona State University, earning PAC-10 All-Conference first team selection in 1996.

A member of the Chile Davis Cup team in 1996 and 1997, Bustos had a singles win over Canada's Andrew Sznajder and was the doubles partner of Marcelo Ríos in three rubbers.

While competing on the professional tour he reached a best singles ranking of 328 in the world.

See also
List of Chile Davis Cup team representatives

References

External links
 
 
 

1971 births
Living people
Chilean male tennis players
Arizona State Sun Devils men's tennis players